Harold Ha (Korean: 하원택; born March 16, 1982), better known as Bizniz (Korean: 비즈니즈), is a South Korean rapper and singer signed to Brand New Music. He debuted as a member of Korean hip hop group Infinite Flow in 1999, and he released his first solo EP, This Is Bizniz, in 2008.

Discography

Albums 
 Ego (2010)
 Angstblute (2012)

EPs 
 This Is Bizniz (2008)
 Strictly Bizniz (2012)
 #evolution (2013)

References

1982 births
K-pop singers
Living people
South Korean composers
South Korean male singers
South Korean pop singers
South Korean male rappers
South Korean hip hop record producers
Show Me the Money (South Korean TV series) contestants
Brand New Music artists